The 193rd Massachusetts General Court is the current meeting of the legislative branch of the state government of Massachusetts, composed of the Massachusetts Senate and the Massachusetts House of Representatives. It first convened in Boston at the Massachusetts State House on January 4, 2023, on the last day of the governorship of Charlie Baker and is scheduled to continue until January 7, 2025, during the first two years of Governor Maura Healey's first term.

Major Events 
 January 4, 2023: General Court convened. Ron Mariano (D) was elected Speaker of the House and Karen Spilka, by unanimous consent, was elected President of the Massachusetts Senate. Members-elect of the Massachusetts Senate and the Massachusetts House of Representatives were sworn in, except for Kristin Kassner (D) and Margaret Scarsdale (D), whose vote count and election certification would be reviewed by a Special House Committee.
 January 5, 2023: Governor-elect Maura Healey (D) and Lieutenant Governor-elect Kim Driscoll (D) were sworn in by the President of the Massachusetts Senate, Karen Spilka, during a joint session of the Massachusetts General Court.
 January 18, 2023: The Special House Committee ruled in favor of Margaret Scarsdale (D) and she was sworn in later that same day.
 February 3, 2023: The Special House Committee ruled in favor of Kristin Kassner (D) and she was sworn in later that same day.

Composition by party
 Resignations and new members are discussed in the "Changes in membership" section below.

Senate

House of Representatives

Leadership

Senate

Presiding 
 President: Karen E. Spilka (D)
 President pro tempore: William N. Brownsberger (D)

Majority (Democratic) 
 Majority Leader: Cynthia Stone Creem
 Assistant Majority Leader: Joan Lovely
 Assistant Majority Leader: Michael J. Barrett
 Assistant Majority Leader: Sal DiDomenico
 Majority Whip: Michael Rush
 Assistant Majority Whip: Julian Cyr
 Senate Ways and Means Chair: Michael Rodrigues
 Senate Ways and Means Vice Char: Cindy Friedman

Minority (Republican) 
 Minority Leader: Bruce E. Tarr
 Assistant Minority Leader: Patrick O'Connor
 Assistant Minority Leader: Ryan Fattman

House of Representatives

Presiding 
 Speaker: Ronald Mariano (D)
 Speaker pro tempore: Kate Hogan (D)

Majority (Democratic) 
 Majority Leader: Michael Moran
 Assistant Majority Leader: Alice Peisch
 Second Assistant Majority Leader: Frank A. Moran
 Second Assistant Majority Leader: Sarah Peake
 First Division Chair: Danielle Gregoire
 Second Division Chair: Paul Donato
 Third Division Chair: Ruth Balser
 Fourth Division Chair: James O'Day
 House Ways and Means Chair: Aaron Michlewitz

Minority (Republican) 
 Minority Leader: Bradley H. Jones Jr.
 First Assistant Minority Leader: Kimberly Ferguson
 Second Assistant Minority Leader: Paul Frost
 Third Assistant Minority Leader: Susan Williams Gifford
 Third Assistant Minority Leader: F. Jay Barrows

Members

Senate
All 40 seats were filled by the election in November 2022. The districts are named and numbered based upon the county or counties they reside in.

 Berkshire, Hampshire, Franklin and Hampden
 Bristol and Norfolk
 Bristol and Plymouth
 Cape and Islands
 Essex
 Essex and Middlesex
 Hampden
 Hampden and Hampshire
 Hampden, Hampshire and Worcester
 Hampshire, Franklin and Worcester
 Middlesex
 Middlesex and Norfolk
 Middlesex and Suffolk
 Middlesex and Worcester
 Norfolk and Middlesex
 Norfolk and Plymouth
 Norfolk, Plymouth and Bristol
 Norfolk and Suffolk
 Norfolk, Worcester and Middlesex
 Plymouth and Barnstable
 Plymouth and Norfolk
 Suffolk
 Suffolk and Middlesex
 Worcester
 Worcester and Hampden
 Worcester and Hampshire
 Worcester and Middlesex

Berkshire, Hampshire, Franklin and Hampden 
 At-large. Paul Mark (D)

Bristol and Norfolk 
 At-large. Paul Feeney (D)

Bristol and Plymouth 
 1. Michael Rodrigues (D)
 2. Mark Montigny (D)
 3. Marc Pacheco (D)

Cape and Islands 
 At-large. Julian Cyr (D)

Essex 
 1. Pavel Payano (D)
 2. Joan Lovely (D)
 3. Brendan Crighton (D)

Essex and Middlesex 
 1. Bruce Tarr (R)
 2. Barry Finegold (D)

Hampden 
 At-large. Adam Gomez (D)

Hampden and Hampshire 
 At-large. John Velis (D)

Hampden, Hampshire and Worcester 
 At-large. Jacob Oliveira (D)

Hampshire, Franklin and Worcester 
 At-large. Jo Comerford (D)

Middlesex 
 1. Edward J. Kennedy (D)
 2. Patricia D. Jehlen (D)
 3. Michael J. Barrett (D)
 4. Cindy Friedman (D)
 5. Jason Lewis (D)

Middlesex and Norfolk 
 At-large. Karen Spilka (D)

Middlesex and Suffolk 
 At-large. Sal DiDomenico (D)

Middlesex and Worcester 
 At-large. Jamie Eldridge (D)

Norfolk and Middlesex 
 At-large. Cynthia Stone Creem (D)

Norfolk and Plymouth 
 At-large. John Keenan (D)

Norfolk, Plymouth and Bristol 
 At-large. Walter Timilty (D)

Norfolk and Suffolk 
 At-large. Mike Rush (D)

Norfolk, Worcester and Middlesex 
 At-large. Becca Rausch (D)

Plymouth and Barnstable 
 At-large. Susan Moran (D)

Plymouth and Norfolk 
 1. Patrick O'Connor (R)
 2. Michael Brady (D)

Suffolk 
 1. Nick Collins (D)
 2. Liz Miranda (D)
 3. Lydia Edwards (D)

Suffolk and Middlesex 
 At-large. Will Brownsberger (D)

Worcester 
 1. Robyn Kennedy (D)
 2. Michael O. Moore (D)

Worcester and Hampden 
 At-large. Ryan Fattman (R)

Worcester and Hampshire 
 At-large. Anne Gobi (D)

Worcester and Middlesex 
 At-large. John J. Cronin (D)

House of Representatives
All 160 seats were filled by the election in November 2022. The districts are named and numbered based upon the county or counties they reside in.

 Barnstable
 Barnstable, Dukes and Nantucket
 Berkshire
 Bristol
 Essex
 Franklin
 Hampden
 Hampshire
 Middlesex
 Norfolk
 Plymouth
 Suffolk
 Worcester

Barnstable 
 1. Chris Flanagan (D)
 2. Kip Diggs (D)
 3. David Vieira (R)
 4. Sarah Peake (D)
 5. Steven Xiarhos (R)

Barnstable, Dukes and Nantucket 
 At-large. Dylan Fernandes (D)

Berkshire 
 1. John Barret III (D)
 2. Tricia Farley-Bouvier (D)
 3. William Pignatelli (D)

Bristol 
 1. F. Jay Barrows (R)
 2. James Hawkins (D)
 3. Carol Doherty (D)
 4. Steve Howitt (R)
 5. Patricia Haddad (D)
 6. Carole Fiola (D)
 7. Alan Silvia (D)
 8. Paul Schmid (D)
 9. Christopher Markey (D)
 10. William M. Straus (D)
 11. Christopher Hendricks (D)
 12. Norman Orrall (R)
 13. Antonio Cabral (D)
 14. Adam Scanlon (D)

Essex 
 1. Dawne Shand (D)
 2. Leonard Mirra (R) 
  Kristin Kassner (D) 
 3. Andy Vargas (D)
 4. Estela Reyes (D)
 5. Ann-Margaret Ferrante (D)
 6. Jerry Parisella (D)
 7. Manny Cruz (D)
 8. Jenny Armini (D)
 9. Donald Wong (R)
 10. Dan Cahill (D)
 11. Peter Capano (D)
 12. Thomas Walsh (D)
 13. Sally Kerans (D)
 14. Adrianne Ramos (D)
 15. Ryan Hamilton (D)
 16. Franciso Paulino (D)
 17. Frank A. Moran (D)
 18. Tram Nguyen (D)

Franklin 
 1. Natalie Blais (D)
 2. Susannah Whipps (U)

Hampden 
 1. Todd Smola (R)
 2. Brian Michael Ashe (D)
 3. Nicholas Boldyga (R)
 4. Kelly Pease (R)
 5. Patricia Duffy (D)
 6. Michael Finn (D)
 7. Aaron Saunders (D)
 8. Shirley Arriaga (D)
 9. Orlando Ramos (D)
 10. Carlos González (D)
 11. Bud Williams (D)
 12. Angelo Puppolo (D)

Hampshire 
 1. Lindsay Sabadosa (D)
 2. Daniel Carey (D)
 3. Mindy Domb (D)

Middlesex 
 1. Margaret Scarsdale (D) 
 2. James Arciero (D)
 3. Kate Hogan (D)
 4. Danielle Gregoire (D)
 5. David Linsky (D)
 6. Priscila Sousa (D)
 7. Jack Patrick Lewis (D)
 8. James Arena-DeRosa (D)
 9. Thomas M. Stanley (D)
 10. John J. Lawn (D)
 11. Kay Khan (D)
 12. Ruth Balser (D)
 13. Carmine Gentile (D)
 14. Simon Cataldo (D)
 15. Michelle Ciccolo (D)
 16. Rodney Elliott (D)
 17. Vanna Howard (D)
 18. Rady Mom (D)
 19. David Allen Robertson (D)

Middlesex (cont.) 
 20. Bradley H. Jones Jr. (R)
 21. Kenneth Gordon (D)
 22. Marc Lombardo (R)
 23. Sean Garballey (D)
 24. David Rogers (D)
 25. Marjorie Decker (D)
 26. Michael Connolly (D)
 27. Erika Uyterhoeven (D)
 28. Joe McGonagle (D)
 29. Steven Owens (D)
 30. Richard Haggerty (D)
 31. Michael S. Day (D)
 32. Kate Lipper-Garabedian (D)
 33. Steven Ultrino (D)
 34. Christine Barber (D)
 35. Paul Donato (D)
 36. Colleen Garry (D)
 37. Danillo Sena (D)

Norfolk 
 1. Bruce Ayers (D)
 2. Tackey Chan (D)
 3. Ron Mariano (D)
 4. James M. Murphy (D)
 5. Mark Cusack (D)
 6. William C. Galvin (D)
 7. William Driscoll (D)
 8. Ted Philips (D)
 9. Marcus Vaughn (R)
 10. Jeffrey Roy (D)
 11. Paul McMurtry (D)
 12. John H. Rogers (D)
 13. Denise Garlick (D)
 14. Alice Peisch (D)
 15. Tommy Vitolo (D)

Plymouth 
 1. Matthew Muratore (R)
 2. Susan Williams Gifford (R)
 3. Joan Meschino (D)
 4. Patrick Joseph Kearney (D)
 5. David DeCoste (R)
 6. Josh S. Cutler (D)
 7. Alyson Sullivan (R)
 8. Angelo D'Emilia (R)
 9. Gerard Cassidy (D)
 10. Michelle DuBois (D)
 11. Rita Mendes (D)
 12. Kathleen LaNatra (D)

Suffolk 
 1. Adrian Madaro (D)
 2. Daniel Joseph Ryan (D)
 3. Aaron Michlewitz (D)
 4. David Biele (D)
 5. Christopher Worrell (D)
 6. Russell Holmes (D)
 7. Chynah Tyler (D)
 8. Jay Livingstone (D)
 9. Jon Santiago (D)
 10. Edward Coppinger (D)
 11. Judith Garcia (D)
 12. Brandy Fluker Oakley (D)
 13. Daniel J. Hunt (D)
 14. Robert Consalvo (D)
 15. Sam Montaño (D)
 16. Jessica Giannino (D)
 17. Kevin Honan (D)
 18. Michael Moran (D)
 19. Jeffrey Turco (D)

Worcester 
 1. Kimberly Ferguson (R)
 2. Jonathan Zlotnik (D)
 3. Michael Kushmerek (D)
 4. Natalie Higgins (D)
 5. Donald Berthiaume (R)
 6. Peter Durant (R)
 7. Paul Frost (R)
 8. Michael Soter (R)
 9. David Muradian (R)
 10. Brian Murray (D)
 11. Hannah Kane (R)
 12. Meghan Kilcoyne (D)
 13. John J. Mahoney (D)
 14. James O'Day (D)
 15. Mary Keefe (D)
 16. Dan Donahue (D)
 17. David LeBoeuf (D)
 18. Joseph McKenna (R)
 19. Kate Donaghue (D)

Changes in membership

Senate changes

House of Representatives changes

Committees

Senate Committees

House of Representatives Committees

Joint Committees

Officers and officials

Senate officers 
 Clerk: Michael D. Hurley

House of Representatives officers 
 Clerk: Steven T. James

See also
 2022 Massachusetts general election
 2022 Massachusetts gubernatorial election
 List of Massachusetts General Courts

Notes

References

Political history of Massachusetts
Massachusetts legislative sessions
Massachusetts
2022 in Massachusetts